Monster High: Fright On! is a 2011 2D-animated fantasy comedy children's television film special that aired on Nickelodeon in the United States on 30 October 2011.

It is the second film/TV special based on the Monster High fashion doll franchise by Mattel after New Ghoul @ School and it ties into the "School's Out" and "Dead Tired"  branded doll lines which was released separately from the production.

Continuity
Although a sequel to New Ghoul @ School, Fright On! is more in line with the regular webisodes. It takes place supposedly in Volume 2, while New Ghoul @ School is in Volume 1.

Plot
At the Maul, the ghouls and the turtles are waiting for the new Twiheart movie. They learn about the feud between vampires and werewolves after hearing them whisper amongst themselves after seeing Draculaura and Clawd holding hands together. However, it turns out they were just pointing out the toilet paper stuck to Draculaura's boot.

At school later on, the ghouls get caught in the excitement of an announcement. Headmistress Bloodgood said that she was merging Monster High with two other schools. Belfry Prep is an all-vampire school, while Crescent Moon High is exclusively for werewolves. She hopes to eventually unite all monsters and then eventually even the human community. While this unnerved Draculaura and Clawdeen greatly, Frankie saw this as an opportunity to unite the two backgrounds, especially after the Fear Squad was placed as welcoming committee. With a little help from Abbey, the ghouls made a killer set-up, only to have it ruined after the two schools arrive. Bram Devein and Gory Fangtell, two snobby vampires, and Dougey, a brawny werewolf, are introduced after the three pass snarky comments to one another, after which Romulus, Clawd's childhood friend, tells the werewolves to not cause trouble on their first day at their new school.

The first day is an initial disaster. The vampires and werewolves claim species-only territory within the school. Cleo clashes with Gory, who attempts to take over the fear squad and make it vampires only, and Romulus is shocked and upset to find out that Clawd has fallen in love with a vampire.

Afterwards, Frankie makes the idea for a dance to bring the two together, and makes sure it works with the help of her friends and perfects it by turning Jackson Jekyll into Holt Hyde. But Administrator Van Hellscream, the Normie head of Monster and Normie relations, shows up and ruins everything. He and Crabgrass, his monster assistant, take over Monster High and secretly fuel the flames between vampires and werewolves, under the pretense of maintaining peace. Clawdeen and Clawd's insecure younger sister, Howleen, gets caught up in the middle of it. The two start support groups, Vampowerment and Were Pride. A disapproving Romulus begins to discreetly drive Draculaura and Clawd apart, and the two eventually split after Draculaura questions why Clawd is always listening to Romulus, worried that he was becoming intolerant.

Frankie, realizing that something funny is going on, begins to uncover a dark secret. Crabgrass has turned Bloodgood to stone using Gorgon Dust and had taken her shape, and her statue was now on display in the courtyard. Despite trying to warn the others, only Abbie and Lagoona believe her. She learns from Deuce she can return someone who has been turned to stone back to normal with the powder and recovers it with Spectra and Lagoona's help. When she and Abbey plan to change Bloodgood back to normal, Howleen and Draculaura both show up after getting suspicious text messages. Bloodgood is rescued, but Van Hellscream traps them and places them above a pit in the Catacombs, where they are left to die. Van Hellscream reveals that he believes monsters are dangerous and must be separated from Normie's, and that he has devoted his life to stopping the schools from being united. Upon realizing that Draculaura and Howleen are missing, the vampires and werewolves blame each other and decide to end the feud with an all-out fight in the gym at midnight (which was what Van Hellscream and Crabgrass really wanted all along). Clawd and Clawdeen become frantic when they realize that Frankie and Abby are also missing, and Clawdeen realizes that Frankie was right after they find Bloodgood's statue is missing. Meanwhile, Abbey gets the girls out of their cage, and with a little help from Operetta, Clawdeen, and Clawd, they make their escape out of the Catacombs just in time. Howleen realizes that she was wrong about vampires being bad after Draculaura jumps in front of her to protect her from a Gargoyle attack.

Meanwhile, the final fight is just about to break out between the vampire and werewolves in the gym. Van Hellscream hopes that the Skullastic Superintendents will see this and realize that monsters are meant to be separated. During this, Cleo realizes she is treating Ghoulia the same way the vampires are the zombies and apologizes. The fight is about to start when Howleen and Draculaura rush in, revealing that neither group kidnapped them, and Frankie delivers a heart-touching speech that finally unites them, bringing peace. As the attendants come through the doors they see how great everyone is getting along, and Van Hellscream and Crabgrass try to escape but are stopped when Cleo brings Deuce up and he petrifies them. After this, Romulus reconciles with Clawd and becomes friendly with Draculaura, Clawdeen starts to respect Howleen, who apologizes for stealing her clothes, Cleo and Gory become friends, and Gory starts to treat the zombies more like friends than slaves.

Cast

 Kate Higgins as Frankie Stein
 Debi Derryberry as Draculaura
 Salli Saffioti as Cleo de Nile & Clawdeen Wolf
 Laura Bailey as Lagoona Blue & Headless Headmistress Bloodgood
 Yuri Lowenthal as Deuce Gorgon, Gillington "Gil" Webber & Bram Devein
 Audu Paden as Ghoulia Yelps, Mr. Hackington, Manny Taur, Sloman "Slo-Mo" Mortavitch & Nightmare
 Cindy Robinson as Jackson Jekyll/Holt Hyde & Gory Fangtell
 Erin Fitzgerald as Abbey Bominable & Spectra Vondergeist
 America Young as Toralei Stripe & Howleen Wolf
 Ogie Banks as Clawd Wolf
 Gigi Sarroino as Operetta
 Cam Clarke as Heath Burns, Hoodude Voodoo, Van Hellscream, Romulus & Mr. Rotter
 Wendee Lee as Nefera de Nile & Mrs. Crabgrass

Reception
CineMagazine rated it 2.5 stars.

References

External links

2010s American television specials
2011 animated films
2011 television specials
American fantasy comedy films
American animated horror films
American animated fantasy films
American animated comedy films
2010s fantasy comedy films
Halloween television specials
Monster High
Children's horror films
2010s children's films
Films based on fashion dolls
Films based on Mattel toys
2010s American films
Canadian animated comedy films
2010s Canadian films
Canadian animated fantasy films